is a Japanese manga series written and illustrated by Mizuki Kawashita. It was serialized in Shueisha's Weekly Shōnen Jump from July 2009 to January 2010, with its chapters collected into three tankōbon volumes.

Plot
The story of Anedoki is about the 13-year-old Kouta Ochiai, who meets a mysterious girl on his way home from school. She asks him if he was willing to share his ice cream and then called him a pervert after noticing and wondering what Kouta was thinking when she was eating. Shocked about the accusation, he runs away, dropping his student handbook by accident. Arriving at home the situation gets out of hand as his father gets transferred because of his work and if it was not enough being on his own, the mysterious girl he met before meets him again.  By giving back his student book and the situation Kouta was in, she decides to repay the favor for the ice cream by taking care of Kouta while his father was gone.  She introduced herself as Natsuki Hagiwara, a 17-year-old high school student who declared she would be his maid for the time he is left on his own. A sequel chapter was recently added, which is set four years later and contains four pages.

Characters

 A 13-year-old first-year middle school student. He is a normal guy who is at an age when he starts to be interested in girls but gets mad as soon as people call him a kid because of his size. He thinks that he is more of an adult than Natsuki but is easily embarrassed when she is around him. This could be from his father as he always acted childish and blew all of his money (and company money) at strip clubs. Kouta doesn't really get the difference between swimwear and underwear. When Natsuki's clothes are torn off, she covers herself in embarrassment but he says there is no difference. He never seemed to have an attraction towards Natsuki until after her sister Chiaki asked him if he did, where now he starts to question why he has all of a sudden had an attraction towards her when he personally sees her as a nuisance, but most of the time his thoughts leads to some perverted action she has done around him. However, as of recently he has started to show feelings for Kanade after she confessed her feelings to him as well as the rumor that she kissed him. However, he finally realises that he likes Natsuki. He confesses to Natsuki in the 26th chapter. In the "sequel" to chapter 26, Kouta returns to town after four years have passed and reunites with Natsuki in similar way to when they first met.

 A carefree high school student who gets involved in Kouta's life when she volunteers herself to be his housemate. She seems to be more childish than Kouta but sometimes acts like a real adult. Her motives for taking care of Kouta are unknown except that she has to return the favor for ice cream. Aside from her childish and self-centered personality, she seems to be a skilled fighter, taking down 3 bullies with no real effort while Kouta protects Kanade. She is a bit of a mystery as well, as Kouta wonders where she goes to school, why she is doing all of this, and why she possesses so much money (she had six hundred thousand yen, however half of this was revealed to be from everyone she was holding for a school trip). She has a habit of falling out of the bed to where she sleeps with Kouta and at a certain time in the night she will sleepwalk to whatever room Kouta is in and lay with him if they aren't in the same room. Although she can be immature, she usually finds a way to help Kouta with the problems he has. In the 8th chapter, it is revealed she has a sister whose name is Chiaki. Though of recently, if she gets sick she has a strange habit of making her food really spicy. As of chapter 19, Natsuki commented that she would be happy if she had been born four years later and would be in the same class so they could be together daily but later stated she was only kidding and this leaves some obvious hints that she has feelings for Kouta as a boyfriend-girlfriend or brother-sister relationship is still yet to be known. Yet in chapter 22, Kouta has confessed his feelings just as Natsuki burst through the doors trying to rescue Kouta. Unfortunately, Natsuki was unable to hear this only to resume things back to normal. However in chapter 26, Kouta confessed to Natsuki while leaving and Natsuki on hearing this kissed him. Natsuki waits for Kouta, and four years later when he returns to town, they are reunited in the same place they first met and, just like how they first met, she demands that he gives her his popsicle.

 Kouta's classmate who was the focus of attention at her school until Natsuki started visiting. At their first meeting, Kouta falls asleep due to the lack of sleep he got after the first night with Natsuki staying at his house. Angry about his reaction and the way Natsuki presented herself, she gets into trouble with a group of high school students, only to be then protected by Kouta who couldn't look away from the fact that she was in danger. It is because of this that she may have taken a liking to Kouta because of the way he stood up against them, though is quick to deny this if someone points that out. When Kouta skips school to follow Natsuki, she accompanies his friends to his house to see why he was not at school.  She seems to have an inferiority complex towards Natsuki, as shown when she tries to catch the boys' attention to no avail, when Natsuki is around. She later confesses her feelings towards Kouta during the fireworks festival, however became depressed when he wouldn't give her an answer. However after comforting words from Natsuki she continues to go after Kouta, changing her hairdo and swearing that she will not lose to that sexy old fox (Natsuki). At the end of the series she realises that Kouta likes Natsuki and tells him to go tells her so he wouldn't regret it. She then cries with her face hidden away from Kouta which reveals how much she actually likes him.

 Natsuki's younger sister who moves into Kouta's house to try to protect Natsuki from Kouta's assumed perverted actions.  She is extremely bad at doing household chores, and she cannot cook at all, but very smart and is down to earth, unlike Natsuki. As Kouta says, the two sisters are polar opposites. Chiaki has started to like Kouta, but covers it up by stating that everything he does is perverted (from washing her sister's clothes to eating pudding).

Publication
Anedoki is written and illustrated by Mizuki Kawashita. It was serialized in Weekly Shōnen Jump from July 6, 2009 to January 18, 2010. Shueisha compiled its individual chapters into three tankōbon volumes published from December 4, 2009 to April 2, 2010.

Volume list

Reception
Volume 1 reached number 14 on the Oricon weekly rankings, selling 54,618 copies in its first week. Volume 2 reached number 11, selling 56,282 copies. Volume 3 reached number 17.

References

External links

2009 manga
Shōnen manga
Shueisha manga